Gur or GUR may refer to:

People
 Gür, a Turkish given name and surname
 Aliza Gur (born 1940), Israeli actress
 Batya Gur (1947–2005), Israeli writer
 Efraim Gur (born 1955), Israeli politician
 Haviv Rettig Gur (born 1981), Israeli journalist
 Janna Gur, Israeli food writer
 Mordechai Gur (1930–1995), Israeli politician; Chief of Staff of the Israeli Defense Forces
 Nándor Gúr (born 1957), Hungarian politician
 Sergei Gur (born 1978), Belarusian kickboxer

Places
 Gur, Tibet, China
 Gur, Iran
 Gur (river), Russian Far East

Other
 Gur (Hasidic dynasty)
 Gur languages
 Gurney Airport, in Papua New Guinea
 Jaggery, a sugar product of Bangladesh, India, Pakistan
 Persian onager, a subspecies of Asiatic wild ass
 TCG Gür (S-334), a Turkish submarine
 Gur, an Ancient Mesopotamian unit of measurement for grain
 GUR, a form of Ultra-high-molecular-weight polyethylene used for joint replacements 
 Gur, the standard abbreviation for the orchid genus Guarianthe
 GUR (ГУР), Main Directorate of Intelligence (Ukraine), a directorate within the Ukrainian ministry of defense